Geir Gulliksen (born 9 January 1960) is a Norwegian show jumping competitor.

At the 2008 Summer Olympics in Beijing, Gulliksen originally won the bronze medal as part of the Norwegian team in team jumping, together with Morten Djupvik, Stein Endresen, and Tony Andre Hansen. However the Norwegian team lost its bronze medal and finished tenth following the disqualification of Tony Andre Hansen.

References

External links
 
 
 

1960 births
Living people
Norwegian male equestrians
Olympic equestrians of Norway
Competitors stripped of Summer Olympics medals
Equestrians at the 2008 Summer Olympics
Equestrians at the 2020 Summer Olympics